Mont-Tremblant (Lac Maskinongé) Water Aerodrome  is located on Lake Maskinongé,  south southwest of St-Jovite (Mont-Tremblant) in Quebec, Canada. It is open from mid-May to mid-October.

References

Registered aerodromes in Laurentides
Seaplane bases in Quebec